Battle Creek Central High School (BCCHS) is a public high school in Battle Creek, Michigan, United States. It is the sole high school in the Battle Creek Public Schools district, and one of four public high schools in Battle Creek.

Demographics 
The demographic breakdown of the 1,041 students enrolled in 2018-19 was:

 Male - 51.9%
 Female - 48.1%
 Native American - 0.6%
 Asian - 4.5%
 Black - 36.8%
 Hispanic - 13.8%
 White - 34.3%
 Multiracial - 12.0%

Notable alumni 

Tom Beard, National Football League player. 
 Basil W. Brown, former member of the Michigan senate
 Darcy C. Coyle, former President of Nichols College and Upper Iowa University
 Harry A. DeMaso, former member of the Michigan legislature
 John Kitzmiller, former film actor
 Barbara Lett-Simmons, former politician
 Tony McGee, NFL player with the Washington Redskins and Chicago Bears
 Mike Nofs, politician
 Joe Schwarz, former member of the United States House of Representatives

References

External links 

 Official website

Public high schools in Michigan
Schools in Calhoun County, Michigan
Battle Creek, Michigan
Educational institutions established in 1908
1908 establishments in Michigan